James Duncan Bowie (9 August 1924 – 4 August 2000) was a Scottish professional football inside forward who played in the Football League for Watford, Chelsea, Fulham and Brentford. After his retirement from football, he managed Trowbridge Town. As a player, Bowie was described as "a gifted, quicksilver inside forward".

Playing career
Born in Kintore, Aberdeenshire, Bowie began his career with local club Parkvale and turned professional in October 1943. He guested for English clubs Middlesbrough and Hounslow Town and moved to Chelsea for a £25 fee in February 1944. Bowie had to wait until 1947–48, the second season of First Division football after the war, to make his debut and went on to make 84 appearances and score 22 goals before departing in January 1951. After short spells with West London rivals Fulham and Brentford, Bowie dropped down to the Third Division South to join Watford in July 1952. He made 130 appearances and scored 40 goals during three-and-a-half years at Vicarage Road and dropped into non-league football in January 1956. Aside from a return to Fulham in May 1957, for whom he failed to make any further appearances, Bowie spent the remainder of his career in non-league football.

Managerial career 
After his retirement from football, Bowie managed Western League First Division club Trowbridge Town.

Personal life 
Bowie served as a private on home service in the British Army during the Second World War. Later in life, he ran pubs in Northwood, Trowbridge and Great Wakering.

Career statistics

References

Further reading

External links

1924 births
2000 deaths
Scottish footballers
English Football League players
Chelsea F.C. players
Fulham F.C. players
Brentford F.C. players
Watford F.C. players
Bedford Town F.C. players
Oxford United F.C. players
March Town United F.C. players
Wisbech Town F.C. players
Middlesbrough F.C. wartime guest players
Southern Football League players
Association football inside forwards
British Army personnel of World War II
British Army soldiers
Military personnel from Aberdeenshire